Filmworks V: Tears of Ecstasy is a film score by John Zorn. The album was released on Zorn's own label, Tzadik Records, in 1996. It features the music that Zorn wrote and recorded for the movie Tears of Ecstasy (1995) by director Oki Hiroyuki.

Reception
The Allmusic review by Joslyn Layne awarded the album 3 stars noting that "There are small instances of theme recurrence throughout the album, but Film Works, Vol. 5 is mostly an entertaining musical ride".

Track listing
All compositions by John Zorn
 "Factor"                                   -                   1:02
 "Intercept"                                -                   1:13
 "Lemma"                                    -                   1:18
 "Root"                                     -                   1:06
 "Net"                                      -                   1:19
 "Lie Group"                                -                   1:10
 "Reduction"                                -                   1:03
 "Trisectrix of MacLaurin"                  -                   1:07
 "Interpolation"                            -                   1:09
 "Gradients"                               -                   1:16
 "Random Walk"                             -                   1:27
 "Cusp"                                    -                   1:04
 "Region"                                  -                   1:07
 "Block"                                   -                   1:09
 "Prediction"                              -                   1:09
 "Concordance"                             -                   1:13
 "Modulus"                                 -                   1:01
 "Addition"                                -                   1:08
 "Ergodicity"                              -                   1:24
 "Prism"                                   -                   1:15
 "Mean Difference"                         -                   2:13
 "Likelihood"                              -                   1:18
 "Deviation"                               -                   1:02
 "Curl"                                    -                   1:12
 "Probable Error"                          -                   1:24
 "Limit"                                   -                   1:09
 "Youden Square"                           -                   1:19
 "Tensor"                                  -                   1:06
 "Martingale"                              -                   1:05
 "Tantochrone"                             -                   1:07
 "Witch of Agnesi"                         -                   1:14
 "Rank"                                    -                   0:58
 "Quadrature"                              -                   1:03
 "Discriminant"                            -                   1:23
 "Rose Curve"                              -                   1:07
 "Lituus"                                  -                   1:04
 "Involute"                                -                   1:06
 "Catearies"                               -                   1:12
 "Folium"                                  -                   1:20
 "Edge Train"                              -                   1:16
 "Ruled Surface"                           -                   1:14
 "Slope"                                   -                   1:03
 "Cluster"                                 -                   1:06
 "Spiral"                                  -                   1:16
 "Octal"                                   -                   1:07
 "Cissoid of Diocles"                      -                   1:15
 "Arc"                                     -                   1:26
 "Pole"                                    -                   1:21
Recorded at Shelley Palmer Studio, New York City on October 1, 1995

Personnel

Robert Quine – guitar
Marc Ribot – guitar
Cyro Baptista – percussion
John Zorn – alto saxophone, prepared piano, samples
Jason Baker – vocal

References

Tzadik Records soundtracks
Albums produced by John Zorn
John Zorn soundtracks
1996 soundtrack albums
Film scores
Film soundtracks